Un largo amor is a Mexican telenovela produced by Telesistema Mexicano in 1965.

Cast 
Antonio Bravo
Enrique García Álvarez
Queta Lavat

References

External links 

Mexican telenovelas
1965 telenovelas
Televisa telenovelas
Spanish-language telenovelas
1965 Mexican television series debuts
1965 Mexican television series endings